Greatest Hits is the second compilation album from American country music singer Dan Seals. It features his hits from his previous studio albums such as Won't Be Blue Anymore, Rage On, and On Arrival. All tracks were previously released except for the track "Ball and Chain", which was previously unreleased, and newly recorded for this Greatest Hits album. This album peaked at #15 on the Country albums chart.

Track listing

References

Dan Seals albums
Albums produced by Kyle Lehning
1991 greatest hits albums
Capitol Records compilation albums